Mauss is a German surname. Notable people with the surname include:

François Mauss, the founder and president of the Grand Jury Européen
Karl Mauss (1898–1959), German military commander
Marcel Mauss (1872–1950), French sociologist and ethnologist
Werner Mauss (born 1940), German private investigator

See also
M.A.U.S.S., acronym for the Mouvement Anti-Utilitariste dans les Sciences Sociales (Anti-utilitarian Movement in the Social Sciences)  a French intellectual movement started in 1981

German-language surnames